Kena or KENA may refer to:

Places 
 Kena (Vilnius), a village in Lithuania
 Kena, old spelling for Qena, a city in Egypt
 Kena Cone, a volcanic hill in Canada
 Kena (river), a river in Russia

People with the name 
 Jomde Kena (1965–2017), Indian politician
 Kena Mphonda, Malawian diplomat

Other uses 
 Kena, alternative spelling of Quena, a notched flute of the Andes
 Kena Upanishad, a Vedic Sanskrit text
 Kena: Bridge of Spirits, an action-adventure video game

Radio stations 
 KENA (AM), a radio station (1450 AM) licensed to serve Mena, Arkansas, United States
 KENA-FM, a radio station (104.1 FM) licensed to serve Hatfield, Arkansas
 KILX, a radio station (102.1 FM) licensed to serve Mena, Arkansas, which held the call sign KENA-FM from 1988 to 2014

See also 
 Kaena (disambiguation)
 Qena